Gordon Robert Ramsay (22 March 1929 - 30 March 2011) was an Australian rules footballer who played with St Kilda in the Victorian Football League (VFL).

Notes

External links 

Gordon Ramsay's playing statistics from The VFA Project

1929 births
2011 deaths
Australian rules footballers from Victoria (Australia)
St Kilda Football Club players
Port Melbourne Football Club players
Sandringham Football Club players